The 1938–39 Scottish Division One was the last season of competitive football in Scotland before World War II. The league championship was won by Rangers by eleven points over nearest rival Celtic.

League table

Results

References 

 Scottish Football Archive

1938–39 Scottish Football League
Scottish Division One seasons
Scot